The Elks Victory Lodge–Ruby's Grill Building is a two-story, commercial brick structure in northeast Oklahoma City, Oklahoma.

Built in 1929 by Dr. Wyatt H. Slaughter, a prominent African-American physician and businessman, the building was a center of African-American life in northeast Oklahoma City. It housed the Victory Lodge of the Improved Benevolent Protective Order of Elks of the World. It later served as a specialty store and restaurant space.

It was listed on the National Register of Historic Places in 1996.

References

Buildings and structures in Oklahoma City
Clubhouses on the National Register of Historic Places in Oklahoma
Commercial buildings completed in 1929
Commercial buildings on the National Register of Historic Places in Oklahoma
Elks buildings
National Register of Historic Places in Oklahoma City
Restaurants in Oklahoma
Restaurants on the National Register of Historic Places